Shadows Linger (released October 1984) is the second novel in Glen Cook's ongoing series, The Black Company.  The series combines elements of epic fantasy and dark fantasy as it follows an elite mercenary unit, The Black Company, through roughly 40 years of its approximately 400-year history.

Plot introduction
In the earlier book the setting begins with the company employed by a Syndic, but the captain slays him because he thinks he is fighting for a lost cause, for little pay, and he does not want to sentence the company to its doom. Soulcatcher, the Taken that recruited them, becomes their mentor. They do many missions for the Lady. They end up being pushed, along with the rest of the Lady's forces, back to her HQ, the tower at Charm. They have an immense battle where many of the company are lost. The Taken backstab each other during the battle except for Soulcatcher, who flees only to be hunted down and destroyed by Croaker and the Lady who use a set of magical arrows to kill her. The old legend, that tells the tale of The Lady and The Dominator, her worse than evil husband, and The White Rose who imprisons them is centuries in the past. The Dominator and his wife, the Lady, (both supremely skilled in the art of magic), had founded an empire legendary for evil. They were overthrown by a rebellion led by the White Rose, but even in defeat, they remained too powerful to be killed; the best the rebels could do was to imprison them in the Barrowland.  The Lady escaped to rebuild the empire, but betrayed her husband, leaving him there.  The Black Company recounted how she crushed several deadly challenges to her power, but those were not the only threats to her reign.

Plot summary

The Black Company is ordered to march thousands of miles across the Lady's vast empire to the Barrowland. A small detachment, including the company's doctor and historian, Croaker, is flown to Juniper, a run-down port outside the empire, at the request of the local prince, to investigate its magical connection to the Barrowland.

By coincidence, Raven, a deserter from the company, and his ward Darling are living at Marron Shed's dilapidated hotel in Juniper. Raven has been accumulating money any way he can, including selling dead (and almost dead) bodies to the non-human residents of a mysterious black castle that is steadily growing, fueling the unease of the city's residents.  Shed also desperately needs money, to pay his loanshark Krage.  Raven does him a favor by letting him participate in his body-selling venture. When Raven and Shed find out that Shed's acquaintance, Asa, has been robbing the dead in the catacombs, they follow suit. A minor incident escalates into a life-and-death struggle between Krage and Raven, which the former loses; Krage and many of his henchmen are sold for a hefty sum to the castle.

Two of the Lady's most powerful wizards, Whisper and Feather, arrive in Juniper to investigate the castle and determine that it is an attempt by the Dominator to escape. Raven, while trying to protect Darling, had been unwittingly aiding her worst enemy. If the castle gets sufficient bodies to grow large enough, the Dominator will be freed.

Once he learns of Raven's presence, Croaker becomes worried, for he knows why Raven deserted: Darling is the reincarnation of the White Rose, the nemesis of both the Lady and the Dominator.  If the Lady ever found out, Croaker and the rest of the company would be done for. Fortunately, Raven and Darling sail away as soon as the winter ice melts, taking Asa with them, in the ship Raven had built with his ill-gotten loot.

Shed continues to have money troubles, forcing him to sell his embezzling cousin and a treacherous lover to the castle, but is finally caught by the company. Croaker realizes that he cannot risk handing him over to Whisper for questioning, as the company's connection to Darling would be revealed, so he fakes Shed's death. Asa returns to the town shortly afterwards, bringing news that Raven has been killed.

Meanwhile, fierce fighting breaks out between the castle's inhabitants and the Lady's forces, now including the Lady herself, the rehabilitated Limper, Feather and Journey, as well as the remainder of the Black Company. Feather is slain. In the confusion of the climactic battle, Croaker, Shed, Asa, the lieutenant and many of the old-time company members sail away, rightfully fearing that the Lady will learn the truth about Darling. The company's captain dies when he tries in a heroic attempt to save the company by making sure the Lady's carpet cannot be used to chase them down.  He does this by flying it on a suicide run into a cliff. The lieutenant takes command of the company.

At the next port, the fleeing band find Raven's ship. Croaker determines that their friend had only staged his death and the men begin searching for him and Darling. In the process, they discover that some of the Dominator's minions had slipped away from Juniper and planted the seed for another castle in a new, more secluded spot. Croaker informs the Lady when she contacts him magically.

Back in Juniper, the Lady emerges victorious over her husband. Whisper and the Limper then take an unauthorized side trip to track down the remnants of the company. The lieutenant barely gets away in the ship with most of the men, but Croaker, Shed, Silent, Goblin, One-Eye and a few others are left behind. With no other choice, they ambush the Taken and succeed in hurting them badly enough to get away, though Shed is killed.

When they link up with the lieutenant in another port town, they learn that he had found Darling and Raven had died in an accident immediately prior to his arrival. They become Rebels—the very group they were fighting against—to protect Darling who is The White Rose. They then prepare to spend the next 29 years on the run, waiting for the return of the Great Comet, which prophecies say will signal the downfall of the Lady.

Characters in Shadows Linger

The Black Company
Croaker - the company's doctor and historian
The captain - leader of the Black Company
The lieutenant - his second in command
Silent, Goblin, One-Eye - moderately talented company wizards
Elmo - the sergeant
Otto and Hagop - veteran mercenaries

The Empire
The Lady
The Taken
Limper
Whisper
Feather
Journey

Residents of Juniper
Marron Shed - owner of the Iron Lily, an establishment one step up from a flophouse. He is deeply in debt to loansharks.
Raven - a mysterious resident of the Lily and a deserter from the Black Company
Darling - a barmaid at the Lily, years ago, she was rescued by Raven
Krage - Shed's main creditor
Asa - a homeless ne'er-do-well who will do anything to avoid honest work, Marron Shed is the closest thing he has to a friend.
Gilbert - one of the loansharks to whom Shed to is in debt, he is intent on taking over the Iron Lily

External links
 
 

Fiction about comets
Novels by Glen Cook
1984 American novels
American fantasy novels
Tor Books books